Geldagana, also spelled as Geldagan, is a rural locality (a selo) in Kurchaloyevsky District, Chechnya.

Administrative and municipal status 
Municipally, Geldagana is incorporated as Geldaganskoye rural settlement. It is the administrative center of the municipality and is the only settlement included in it.

Geography 

Geldagana is located on the right bank of the Khulkhulau River and on both banks of the Akhko River.

The nearest settlements to Geldagana are Ilaskhan-Yurt in the north-east, the town of Kurchaloy in the east, Niki-Khita in the south-east, Avtury in the south-west, Germenchuk in the west, and Tsotsi-Yurt in the north-west.

History 
In 1944, after the genocide and deportation of the Chechen and Ingush people and the Chechen-Ingush ASSR was abolished, the village of Geldagana was renamed to Novaya Zhizn (roughly translated from Russian as "New Life") and settled by people from the neighbouring republic of Dagestan.

In the early 1990s, the village regained its old Chechen name, Geldagana.

Population 
 1970 Census: 5,357
 1979 Census: 5,333
 1990 Census: 5,020
 2002 Census: 11,875
 2010 Census: 12,350
 2019 estimate: 13,876

According to the results of the 2010 Census, the majority of residents of Geldagana (12,300) were ethnic Chechens, with 50 people from other ethnic groups.

References 

Rural localities in Kurchaloyevsky District